This is a chronological list of notable books written about cannabis. Both fictional and non-fictional books are included.

Fiction 
 It's Just a Plant (2005) by Ricardo Cortés
 Legal High (2016) by Rainer Schmidt

Non-fiction 
 The Hasheesh Eater (1857) by Fitz Hugh Ludlow
 Les Paradis artificiels (1860) by Charles Baudelaire 
 Marihuana Reconsidered (1971) by Lester Grinspoon
 Licit and Illicit Drugs (1972) by Edward M. Brecher
 Reefer Madness: The History of Marijuana in America (1979) by Larry Sloman
 Marihuana: The First Twelve Thousand Years (1980) by Ernest Lawrence Abel
The Emperor Wears No Clothes (1985) by Jack Herer
Drug Warriors and Their Prey: From Police Power to Police State (1996) by Richard Miller
 Smoke and Mirrors: The War on Drugs and the Politics of Failure (1996) by Dan Baum
 Marijuana Myths, Marijuana Facts: A Review of the Scientific Evidence (1997) by Lynn Zimmer and John P. Morgan
 Romancing Mary Jane (1998) by Michael Poole
 The Botany of Desire (2001) by Michael Pollan
 Pot Planet (2002) by Brian Preston
 Reefer Madness: Sex, Drugs, and Cheap Labor in the American Black Market (2003) by Eric Schlosser
 The Pot Book (2010) by Julie Holland
 Growgirl (2012) by Heather Donahue
 The Official High Times Cannabis Cookbook (2012) by Elise McDonough
 Too High to Fail (2012) by Doug Fine
 Thai Stick (2013) by Peter H. Maguire
 Humboldt: Life on America's Marijuana Frontier (2013) by Emily Brady
 A New Leaf (2014) by Alyson Martin and Nushin Rashidian
 Hemp Bound (2014) by Doug Fine
 Hidden Harvest (2014) by Mark Coakley
 Marijuana Nation (2014) by Roger Roffman
 Weed Land (2014) by Peter Hecht
 Weed the People (2015) by Bruce Barcott
 Herb: Mastering the Art of Cooking with Cannabis (2015) by Laurie Wolf and Melissa Parks
 Brave New Weed (2016) by Joe Dolce
 Weed: The User's Guide (2016) by David Schmader
 Craft Weed (2018) by Ryan Stoa
 The Little Book of Cannabis (2018) by Amanda Siebert
 Tell Your Children: The Truth About Marijuana, Mental Illness and Violence (2019) by Alex Berenson
 Higher Etiquette (2019) by Lizzie Post
 American Hemp Farmer (2020) by Doug Fine
 Commodifying Cannabis (2020) by Bradley J. Borougerdi
 The Art of Cooking with Cannabis: CBD and THC-Infused Recipes from Across America (2021) by Tracey Medeiros

See also 

 Cannabis cookbook
 List of cannabis columns

Cannabis
 
Cannabis